Barbara Gleim (born May 20, 1964) is an American politician. A Republican, she is a member of the Pennsylvania House of Representatives from the 199th District.

Early life and education
Gleim was born on May 20, 1964 in Lanham, Maryland. She graduated from Glenelg High School in 1982. In 1985, Gleim earned a Bachelor of Arts degree in political science from the University of Maryland. She earned a Master's in Business Administration degree in food and agribusiness from Delaware Valley University in 2009.

Political career
Gleim served on the Cumberland Valley School District school board for eight years, two of which she served as president of the board.

Gleim was elected to represent the 199th District in the Pennsylvania House of Representatives in 2018. She won re-election in 2020 and 2022.

In 2020, Gleim was among 26 Pennsylvania House Republicans who called for the reversal of Joe Biden's certification as the winner of Pennsylvania's electoral votes in the 2020 United States presidential election, citing false claims of election irregularities.

Personal life
Gleim lives in Middlesex Township, Cumberland County, Pennsylvania with husband Tracey. They have three adult children.

References

1964 births
Living people
Republican Party members of the Pennsylvania House of Representatives
University System of Maryland alumni
Delaware Valley University alumni
People from Cumberland County, Pennsylvania
21st-century American politicians
Women state legislators in Pennsylvania
21st-century American women politicians